The rufous-crowned laughingthrush (Pterorhinus ruficeps) is a species of bird in the family Leiothrichidae.
It is endemic to Taiwan.  It was previously considered conspecific with the white-throated laughingthrush, P. albogularis.

This species was formerly placed in the genus Garrulax but following the publication of a comprehensive molecular phylogenetic study in 2018, it was moved to the resurrected genus Pterorhinus''.

References

rufous-crowned laughingthrush
Endemic birds of Taiwan
rufous-crowned laughingthrush
rufous-crowned laughingthrush
Taxobox binomials not recognized by IUCN